

A crack intro, also known as a cracktro, loader, or just intro, is a small introduction sequence added to cracked software. It aims to inform the user which "cracking crew" or individual cracker removed the software's copy protection and distributed the crack.

They first appeared on Apple II computer in the late 1970s or early 1980s, and then on ZX Spectrum, Commodore 64 and Amstrad CPC games that were distributed around the world via Bulletin Board Systems (BBSes) and floppy disk copying. By 1985, when reviewing the commercially available ISEPIC cartridge which adds a custom crack intro to memory dumps of Commodore 64 software, Ahoy! wrote that such intros were "in the tradition of the true hacker". Early crack intros resemble graffiti in many ways, although they invaded the private sphere and not the public space.

As time went on, crack intros became a medium to demonstrate the purported superiority of a cracking group. Such intros grew very complex, sometimes exceeding the size and complexity of the software itself. Crack intros only became more sophisticated on more advanced systems such as the Amiga, Atari ST, and some IBM PC compatibles with sound cards. These intros feature big, colourful effects, music, and scrollers.

Cracking groups would use the intros not just to gain credit for cracking, but to advertise their BBSes, greet friends, and gain themselves recognition. Messages were frequently of a vulgar nature, and on some occasions made threats of violence against software companies or the members of some rival crack-group.

Crack-intro programming eventually became an art form in its own right, and people started coding intros without attaching them to a crack just to show off how well they could program. This practice evolved into the demoscene.

Crack intros and other small software created by software crackers such as keygens and patches that remove protection from commercial applications often use chiptunes in the form of background music. These chiptunes are now still accessible as downloadable musicdisks or musicpacks.

See also
 Chiptune
 Demoscene
 Replay: The History of Video Games – The book describes the Dutch demo making as a major influence on video games in the 1980s.
 Warez scene

References

Further reading
 
 Patryk Wasiak, ‘Illegal Guys’. A History of Digital Subcultures in Europe during the 1980s, in: Zeithistorische Forschungen/Studies in Contemporary History, Online-Ausgabe, 9 (2012), H. 2
  Read online: http://www.scheib.net/play/demos/what/borzyskowski/.
 Hastik, Canan; Steinmetz, Arnd (2012a): Demoscene Artists and Community. In Bours, Patrick; Humm, Bernhard; Loew, Robert; Stengel, Ingo; Walsh, Paul (eds.): Proceedings of CERC 2012, pp. 43–48.
 Driscoll, Kevin; Diaz, Joshua (2009): Endless Loop: A Brief History of Chiptunes. Transformative Works and Cultures 9, 2009.

External links
 World of C64 Crackintros – A large collection of C64 cracktros in native "prg" file format (supported by most C64 emulators)
 Defacto2 – Hundreds of cracktros, loaders and installers for the PC
 Amiga Music Preservation – Thousands of cracktros in all tracker formats.
 Chiptune.com – A chiptune dedicated website containing thousands of chiptunes from Amiga and other formats. The website itself emulates the Amiga Workbench 1.3.
 THE AMIGA CRACKTRO MARATHRON – A large back-to-back collection of Amiga cracktros.
 Docsnyderspage.com – Hundreds of C64 crack intros re-coded for the web.
 https://crackpool.net/

Demo effects
Copyright infringement
Software cracking

de:Demoszene#Ursprünge in den Heimcomputern der 1980er